Arthur I. Miller is Emeritus Professor of History and Philosophy of Science at University College London. He took a PhD in physics at the Massachusetts Institute of Technology. From 1991 to 2005 he was Professor of History and Philosophy of Science at University College London (UCL). At UCL, Professor Miller helped restructure an academic unit combining history and philosophy of science, sociology of science, and science communication to create UCL Department of Science and Technology Studies, renamed in 1994. He was instrumental in developing the UK's first undergraduate single honours BSc degree in History and Philosophy of Science, at UCL, launched in 1993.

Selected bibliography

Books

 
 
 
 
 

 Deciphering the Cosmic Number—The Strange Friendship of Wolfgang Pauli and Carl Jung, W. W. Norton & Co. (2009) 
 Empire of the Stars: Friendship, Obsession and Betrayal in the Quest for Black Holes, Little, Brown & Company (2005) 
 Deciphering the Cosmic Number (137): Jung, Pauli, and the Pursuit of Scientific Obsession, W. W. Norton & Co. (2009) 
 Colliding Worlds: How Cutting-Edge Science Is Redefining Contemporary Art, W. W. Norton & Company (2014) 
 The Artist in the Machine: The World of AI-Powered Creativity, The MIT Press (2019)

Critical studies and reviews of Miller's work
The artist in the machine
 

Einstein, Picasso

References

External links
 
 Publications at Goodreads.com

Living people
Academics of University College London
Year of birth missing (living people)
Fellows of the American Physical Society